KPFM (105.5 MHz) is an FM radio station broadcasting a country music format. Licensed to Mountain Home, Arkansas, United States.  The station is currently owned by Mountain Home Radio Station, Inc.

References

External links
 

Country radio stations in the United States
PFM
Mountain Home, Arkansas